Allium pyrenaicum is a species of wild garlic native to the Spanish Pyrenees. It prefers to grow in gorges in light shade, on substrates that experience at most moderate disturbance.

References

pyrenaicum
Endemic flora of Spain
Plants described in 1877